Ronald "Ron" Gwyn Waldron (born 14 December 1933 in Neath Abbey) is a former Welsh rugby union international player. He later took up coaching and is best known as the former head coach of Neath RFC during the late 1980s when Neath dominated British rugby for a number of seasons. Waldron built a team of senior international players including Jonathan Davies and Allan Bateman. In 1990 he was appointed coach to the Wales national rugby union team but after certain players from the Cardiff club found his training methods too physically demanding he resigned in 1991.

References

External links
Wales profile

1933 births
Rugby union players from Neath
Welsh rugby union coaches
Welsh rugby union players
Wales national rugby union team coaches
Wales international rugby union players
Rugby union props
Neath RFC players
Barbarian F.C. players
Living people